Kyauktalon may refer to several places in Burma:

 Kyauktalon, Bhamo
Kyauktalon, Indaw
Kyauktalon, Shwegu